Aleksandar "Sasha" Stefanovic (born November 29, 1998) is a Serbian-American professional basketball player for Mega Basket of the ABA League. He played college basketball for the Purdue Boilermakers.

High school career
Stefanovic attended Crown Point High School and played alongside future Indiana player Grant Gelon. Stefanovic averaged 15.4 points, 7 rebounds, and 3.7 assists per game as a junior, earning  First Team All-Region honors. In the 2016 Class 4A Crown Point Sectional championship game against Valparaiso High School, he hit a three-pointer at the end of regulation in a 59–54 double-overtime victory and recorded 18 points. As a senior, Stefanovic averaged 20 points, 7 rebounds and 2.1 assists per game on a team that finished with a 22–4 record and won the Duneland Athletic Conference title. He was named The Times of Northwest Indiana Player of the Year. Stefanovic finished as the school's all-time leading scorer with 1,385 points. A three-star recruit, he received scholarship offers from Loyola–Chicago, Northern Iowa, Valparaiso, Evansville, DePaul and Xavier and also was recruited by Purdue, though Matt Painter admitted the team did not have a scholarship and suggested he attend prep school. In February 2017, a scholarship became available after Basil Smotherman's departure, and Stefanovic committed to playing college basketball for Purdue.

College career
Stefanovic redshirted his true freshman season at Purdue. He played sparingly as a redshirt freshman, averaging 2.5 points and 1.1 rebounds per game. He missed the opening game of his sophomore season against Green Bay due to a foot injury. Stefanovic averaged 9.1 points, 2.4 rebounds and 1.7 assists per game as a sophomore.  He tested positive for COVID-19 in January 2021, forcing him to miss three games. As a junior, Stefanovic averaged 9.3 points, 2.6 rebounds and 2.6 assists per game. He was named Honorable Mention All-Big Ten as a senior.

Professional career
After going undrafted in the 2022 NBA draft, Stefanovic joined the San Antonio Spurs for the 2022 NBA Summer League.

On August 19, 2022, Stefanovic signed his first professional contract overseas with Greek club Kolossos Rodou.

On November 17, 2022, he signed with Mega Basket of the ABA League.

National team career
Stefanovic was a part of the Purdue team chosen to represent the United States in the 2017 Summer Universiade in Taipai, Taiwan. The U.S. received a silver medal after losing in the title game to Lithuania, though Stefanovic sat out the game.

In April 2022, Stefanovic expressed his interest to represent Serbia internationally in the senior competitions, if called.

Career statistics

College

|-
| style="text-align:left;"| 2017–18
| style="text-align:left;"| Purdue
| style="text-align:center;" colspan="11"|  Redshirt
|-
| style="text-align:left;"| 2018–19
| style="text-align:left;"| Purdue
| 36 || 0 || 11.6 || .390 || .410 || .357 || 1.1 || .4 || .6 || .1 || 2.5
|-
| style="text-align:left;"| 2019–20
| style="text-align:left;"| Purdue
| 30 || 22 || 26.4 || .385 || .383 || .816 || 2.4 || 1.7 || 1.0 || .3 || 9.1
|-
| style="text-align:left;"| 2020–21
| style="text-align:left;"| Purdue
| 25 || 21 || 29.4 || .416 || .400 || .842 || 2.6 || 2.6 || .7 || .2 || 9.3
|-
| style="text-align:left;"| 2021–22
| style="text-align:left;"| Purdue
| 37 || 37 || 30.4 || .392 || .380 || .867 || 2.5 || 3.0 || .4 || .2 || 10.4
|- class="sortbottom"
| style="text-align:center;" colspan="2"| Career
| 128 || 80 || 24.0 || .395 || .388 || .810 || 2.1 || 1.9 || .6 || .2 || 7.7

Personal life
His great-grandfather Branko was a native of Serbia who fought in World War II before emigrating to Gary, Indiana to find work in the steel mills. His mother is of ethnic Macedonian descent. Stefanovic's grandfather Zoran received a visa to the United States in 1970 and brought Stefanovic's father, Ljubiša "Lou", with him as a young child. Ljubiša Stefanović played college basketball at Illinois State and was selected by the Seattle SuperSonics in the 1985 NBA draft before playing professionally in Europe for five years. Sasha has an older brother, Dejan.

See also 
 List of Serbian Americans

References

External links
 Purdue Boilermakers bio

1998 births
Living people
People from Crown Point, Indiana
ABA League players
American expatriate basketball people in Greece
American men's basketball players
American people of Serbian descent
American people of Macedonian descent
Basketball players from Indiana
KK Mega Basket players
Kolossos Rodou B.C. players
Medalists at the 2017 Summer Universiade
Purdue Boilermakers men's basketball players
Serbian expatriate basketball people in Greece
Serbian men's basketball players
Serbian people of Macedonian descent
Shooting guards
Universiade medalists in basketball
Universiade silver medalists for the United States